The 1991 Major League Baseball All-Star Game was the 62nd playing of the midsummer classic between the all-stars of the American League (AL) and National League (NL), the two leagues comprising Major League Baseball. The game was held on July 9, 1991, at SkyDome in Toronto, the home of the Toronto Blue Jays of the American League. It was only the second time that the game was played outside the United States, as the National League's Montreal Expos hosted the 1982 Midsummer Classic at Olympic Stadium in Montreal, Quebec. The game resulted in the American League defeating the National League 4-2. Both the winning and losing pitchers represented the Canadian teams; the Blue Jays' Jimmy Key earned the win while the Expos' Dennis Martínez was given the loss.  This was also the only All-Star Game to be awarded by Commissioner A. Bartlett Giamatti, who awarded the game to the Blue Jays on Canada Day 1989.

Rosters
Players in italics have since been inducted into the National Baseball Hall of Fame.

American League

National League

Game

Umpires

Starting lineups

Game summary

Footnotes and references

External links
Baseball-Reference.com
Lineups, boxscore, and more

Major League Baseball All-Star Game
Major League Baseball All-Star Game
Major League Baseball All-Star Game
Baseball competitions in Toronto
Major League Baseball All Star Game
July 1991 sports events in Canada